Fabienne Dongus (born 11 May 1994) is a German footballer who plays as a midfielder for 1899 Hoffenheim and the Germany women's national team.

Career
Dongus made her international debut for Germany in a friendly on 10 April 2021, coming on as a substitute in the 73rd minute for Sara Däbritz against Australia. The home match finished as a 5–2 win for Germany.

Career statistics

International

References

External links
 
 
 
 
 Fabienne Dongus at Soccerdonna.de 

1994 births
Living people
People from Böblingen
Sportspeople from Stuttgart (region)
Footballers from Baden-Württemberg
German women's footballers
Germany women's youth international footballers
Germany women's international footballers
Women's association football midfielders
TSG 1899 Hoffenheim (women) players
Frauen-Bundesliga players
2. Frauen-Bundesliga players
20th-century German women
21st-century German women